Elizabeth Neville may refer to:

Elizabeth Neville (police officer) (born 1953), former Chief Constable of Wiltshire
Elizabeth Danvers née Neville, later Carey, (1545/50 - 1630), English noblewoman
Elizabeth Nevill, 3rd Baroness Bergavenny, (1415–1448) also spelled Neville, née Beauchamp
Elizabeth Neville (died 1621) née Bacon, Lady Neville, later Lady Periam,  English noblewoman, third wife of Sir Henry Neville